In classical music from Western culture, an augmented second is an interval that, in equal temperament, is sonically equivalent to a minor third, spanning three semitones, and is created by widening a major second by a chromatic semitone. For instance, the interval from C to D is a major second, two semitones wide, and the interval from C to D is an augmented second, spanning three semitones.

Usage 
Augmented seconds occur in many scales, most importantly the harmonic minor and its various modes. They also occur in the various Gypsy scales (which consist almost entirely of augmented and minor seconds). In harmonic minor scales, the augmented second occurs between the sixth and seventh scale degrees. For example, in the scale of A harmonic minor, the notes F and G form the interval of an augmented second. This distinguishing feature of harmonic minor scales occurs as a consequence of the seventh scale degree having been chromatically raised in order to allow chords in a minor key to follow the same rules of cadence observed in major keys, where the V chord is "dominant" (that is, contains a major triad plus a minor seventh).

Tuning
An augmented second is enharmonically equivalent to a minor third in equal temperament, but is not the same interval in other meantone tunings. In any tuning close to quarter-comma meantone it will be close to the 7:6 ratio of the septimal minor third.

The 75:64 just augmented second arises in the justly tuned C harmonic minor scale between A and B.

References

Augmented intervals
Seconds (music)